Einar Otto Wallin (born 21 November 1990) is a Swedish professional boxer. He held the WBA Continental heavyweight title in 2017 and won the European Union heavyweight title in 2018. As of October 2022, Wallin is ranked as the world's sixth-best active heavyweight by Transnational Boxing Rankings Board, and ninth by ESPN.

Amateur career
Wallin comes from a working-class family. His father and one of his brothers boxed, and he began boxing when he was 15. As an amateur, he won the Swedish championship for beginners in 2008. There were few heavyweights available to fight in Sweden, where professional boxing was banned until 2007, so Wallin would often fight whoever and whenever in order to stay active.

In 2009, Wallin won a bronze medal at the Swedish Youth National Championships in the heavyweight division, and won the Ruska Tournament in the super-heavyweight division. In 2010, Wallin won silver at the Swedish National Championships, and silver at the Haringey Box Cup, losing to Anthony Joshua on points in the final. He also won silver at the 2010 Ruska Tournament.

Wallin lost to Joshua on points again in a Sweden–England dual match in Stockholm in January 2011. He then won bronze at the Swedish National Championships in February, silver at the Nordic Championships in March, gold at the Algirdas Socikas Tournament in May, gold at the Haringey Box Cup in June, and gold at the Riga Open Tournament in December.

In January 2012, Wallin defeated Frazer Clarke 32:11 in a Sweden–England dual match in Uppsala, which qualified him for the 2012 European Boxing Olympic Qualification Tournament. Wallin won bronze at the Gee-Bee Tournament in March, losing to Magomed Omarov in the semi-finals. At the European Boxing Olympic Qualification Tournament in April in Trabzon, Turkey, he was eliminated in the round of 16 by Mihai Nistor. Wallin finished with an amateur record of 34–12.

Professional career

Early career 
Wallin turned professional at the age of 22, in 2013. He trained under Torsten Schmitz for six months in Berlin, Germany, then moved to Copenhagen, Denmark, where he met former two-weight WBA world champion Joey Gamache, who became his trainer. Wallin followed Gamache to New York after Gamache left Denmark.

Rise up the ranks

Wallin vs. Granat 
After racking up a 19–0 record and winning the WBA Continental heavyweight title, Wallin defeated Adrian Granat (15–1, 14 KOs) to win the vacant Swedish and EBU European Union heavyweight titles in April 2018. Wallin won by unanimous decision 117–111, 117–112, and 118–110. As a tall southpaw, he has also been a sparring partner for Anthony Joshua, Jarrell Miller and Adam Kownacki.

Wallin vs. Kisner 
Wallin then made his United States debut against Nick Kisner (21–4–1, 6 KOs) in April 2019, but the fight ended in a no contest after an accidental clash of heads opened a cut above Kisner's eye in the first round. He was set to fight BJ Flores (34–4–1, 21 KOs) in July, but Flores was ruled medically unfit to fight on the day of the scheduled bout.

Wallin vs. Fury 
On 14 September 2019, Wallin faced the former unified heavyweight world champion Tyson Fury (28–0–1, 20 KOs) at the T-Mobile Arena in Las Vegas. Wallin lost the fight by unanimous decision, with the scorecards reading 116–112, 117–111, and 118–110. He opened up a large cut above Fury's right eye in the third round with a left hand, which affected Fury's vision for the rest of the fight. A ringside doctor examined the cut in the sixth and deemed Fury able to continue. The examination by the doctor seemed to motivate Fury, as he poured on the pressure afterwards, hurting Wallin repeatedly with solid shots. Despite fatiguing in the second half of the fight, Wallin came back in the twelfth and landed a strong left hand which seemed to trouble Fury. Commentators stated Wallin's performance had defied the odds despite the loss, as he came in as an over 10 to 1 underdog.

Wallin vs. Kauffman 
Wallin was set to make his return to the ring against former WBA (Regular) heavyweight world champion Lucas Browne (29–2, 25 KOs) on 28 March 2020 at the Park Theater at the Park MGM in Las Vegas. The fight was scheduled for 10 rounds. On 26 February, Wallin was removed from the card due to a foot injury and was replaced by Apti Davtaev. He instead made his return against Travis Kauffman on 15 August 2020. Wallin dominated the fight, and Kauffman retired in the fifth round due to injury.

Wallin vs. Breazeale 
Wallin's next fight was against former IBF and WBC title challenger Dominic Breazeale on the undercard of Adrien Broner vs. Jovanie Santiago on 20 February 2021. The Swede was in control the whole fight and regularly found the target with his straight left hand, causing swelling around Breazeale's right eye. Wallin won a comfortable unanimous decision victory with scores of 117–111, 118–110 and 116–112.

Cancelled Dillian Whyte fight 
On 15 September 2021, it was reported that terms had been agreed between Wallin and the WBC interim heavyweight champion, Dillian Whyte, for a bout on 30 October at the O2 Arena in London, England. However, a mere ten days before the fight was scheduled to occur, it was reported that the fight had been called off due to Whyte allegedly suffering a shoulder injury.

Personal life 
Wallin was born in Sundsvall, Sweden, but has lived in New York City since 2017. Wallin's father died of a sudden heart attack shortly before the announcement of Wallin's fight with Tyson Fury. Wallin said his father, an amateur boxer and part-time trainer, motivated him to get into boxing, and hoped to use his father's death as extra motivation to upset the odds and defeat Fury, similar to Buster Douglas's losing his mother before fighting Mike Tyson. Despite ultimately losing the bout, Wallin's performance was praised. Fury said in his in-ring interview, "Big congratulations to Otto and I just wanna say rest in peace to his father. I know he would be very, very proud of his performance."

Professional boxing record

References

External links 

Otto Wallin - Profile, News Archive & Current Rankings at Box.Live

Swedish male boxers
World Boxing Association champions
Heavyweight boxers
Southpaw boxers
1990 births
Living people
People from Sundsvall
Swedish expatriate sportspeople in the United States
Sportspeople from Västernorrland County